Alfreo Corrias (November 3, 1895 – May 2, 1985) was an Italian lawyer and 20th-century politician. He was Mayor of Oristano (1946–1949) and President of Sardinia (1954–1955). He was a member of Christian Democracy.

References
Elenco storico dei Senatori della Repubblica - C Senato.it
Pagina dedicata sul sito della regione

1895 births
1985 deaths
People from Oristano
Christian Democracy (Italy) politicians
Senators of Legislature V of Italy
Presidents of Sardinia
Corrias
20th-century Italian lawyers
Mayors of Oristano